The Other Life (German: Das andere Leben) is a 1948 Austrian drama film directed by Rudolf Steinboeck and starring Aglaja Schmid, Robert Lindner and Gustav Waldau. The sets were designed by the art director Herbert Ploberger. It is based on the 1947 novella Twentieth of July by Alexander Lernet-Holenia.

Synopsis
During the Nazi era, an Austrian, Elisabeth Josselin, assists Suzette, a Jewish friend, by swapping papers with her so she can get medical treatment. When Suzette dies, Elisabeth finds herself officially dead and so decides to adopt the identity of Suzette. Meanwhile, her husband Major Walter Josselin becomes involved in the July Plot against Adolf Hitler.

Cast
 Aglaja Schmid as Elisabeth Josselin 
 Robert Lindner as Major Walter Josselin 
 Gustav Waldau as Hofrat Buschek 
 Vilma Degischer as Suzette Alberti 
 Leopold Rudolf as Dozent Thomas Alberti 
 Siegfried Breuer as Bukowsky 
 Erik Frey as Latheit 
 Anton Edthofer as General Rissius 
 Hans Ziegler as Dr. Joel 
 Erni Mangold as Mizzi 
 Karl Günther as Oberst Schönborn

References

Bibliography 
 Fritsche, Maria. Homemade Men in Postwar Austrian Cinema: Nationhood, Genre and Masculinity. Berghahn Books, 2013.
 Von Dassanowsky, Robert. Austrian Cinema: A History. McFarland, 2005.

External links 
 

1948 films
Austrian drama films
1948 drama films
1940s German-language films
Films directed by Rudolf Steinboeck
Austrian black-and-white films
Sascha-Film films